John Trumbull (June 6, 1756November 10, 1843) was an American artist of the early independence period, notable for his historical paintings of the American Revolutionary War, of which he was a veteran. He has been called the "Painter of the Revolution".

Trumbull's Declaration of Independence (1817), one of his four paintings that hang in the United States Capitol rotunda, is used on the reverse of the current United States two-dollar bill.

Early life
Trumbull was born in Lebanon, Connecticut, in 1756, to Jonathan Trumbull and Faith (née Robinson) Trumbull. His father served as governor of Connecticut from 1769 to 1784. Both sides of his family were descended from early Puritan settlers in the state.

He had two older brothers, Joseph Trumbull, the first commissary general of the Continental Army in the Revolutionary War, and Jonathan Trumbull Jr., who became the second Speaker of the House of the United States.

The young Trumbull entered the 1771 junior class at Harvard College at age 15 and graduated in 1773. Due to a childhood accident, Trumbull lost the use of one eye. This may have influenced his detailed painting style.

Revolutionary War
As a soldier in the American Revolutionary War, Trumbull rendered a particular service at Boston by sketching plans of the British and American lines and works. He witnessed the Battle of Bunker Hill. He was appointed second aide-de-camp to General George Washington, and in June 1776, deputy adjutant general to General Horatio Gates. He resigned from the army in 1777 after a dispute over the dating of his officer commission.

In 1780, with funds depleted, Trumbull turned to art as a profession. He traveled to London, where upon introduction from Benjamin Franklin, Trumbull studied under Benjamin West. At West's suggestion, Trumbull painted small pictures of the War of Independence and miniature portraits. He painted about 250 in his lifetime. He also painted a portrait of Washington from memory during this time.

On September 23, 1780, British agent Major John André was captured by Continental troops in North America; he was hanged as a spy on October 2, 1780. After news reached Great Britain, outrage flared and Trumbull was arrested for high treason, as he was an officer in the Continental Army of similar rank to André. He was imprisoned for seven months in London's Tothill Fields Bridewell.

After being released, Trumbull returned to the United States on a voyage that lasted six months, ending in late January 1782. He then joined his brother David in supplying the army stationed at New Windsor, New York, during the winter of 1782–83.

Postwar years

In 1784, following Britain's recognition of the United States' independence, Trumbull returned to London for painting study under West. His first major work, The Deputation from the Senate Presenting to Cincinnatus the Command of the Roman Armies, was accepted and displayed by the Royal Academy of Arts in that year. In this work, Trumbull had painted Lucius Quinctius Cincinnatus in the likeness of George Washington. The painting's location is unknown. While working in his studio, Trumbull painted Battle of Bunker Hill and Death of General Montgomery in the Attack on Quebec; both works are now in the Yale University Art Gallery.

In July 1786, Trumbull went to Paris, where he made portrait sketches of French officers for the Surrender of Lord Cornwallis. With the assistance of Thomas Jefferson, serving there as the American minister to France, Trumbull began the early composition of the Declaration of Independence. Over the next 5 years, Trumbull painted small portraits of the signers, which he later used to piece together the larger painting. If the signer was deceased, a previous portrait would be copied, as was the case with Arthur Middleton, whose head position stands out in the painting. While visiting with each signer or his family, Trumbull, always looking for funding, used the occasion to sell subscriptions to engravings that would be produced from his paintings of the American Revolution.

While in Paris, Trumbull is credited with having introduced Jefferson to Italian painter Maria Cosway; they became lifelong intimate friends. Trumbull's painting of Jefferson, commissioned by Cosway, became widely known due to a later engraving of it by Asher Brown Durand, which was reproduced.

Trumbull's Declaration of Independence painting was purchased by the United States Congress, along with his Surrender of General Burgoyne, Surrender of Lord Cornwallis, and General George Washington Resigning His Commission, all related to the Revolution.  All now hang in rotunda of the United States Capitol. Congress reportedly authorized only funds sufficient to purchase these four paintings.

Trumbull completed several other paintings related to the Revolution: 
Death of General Warren at the Battle of Bunker's Hill (one version is held by the Boston Museum of Fine Arts); 
Death of General Montgomery in the Attack on Quebec 
Capture of the Hessians at Trenton 
George Washington at Trenton, New Jersey, on the night of January 2, 1777 (The artist considered this portrait "the best certainly of those which I painted")
Death of General Mercer at the Battle of Princeton
Washington at Verplanck's Point, a 1790 gift to Martha Washington
George Washington, commissioned by the City of New York in 1790 
The Sortie Made by the Garrison of Gibraltar, 1789.

Middle years

Trumbull's portraits also include full lengths of General Washington (1790) and George Clinton (1791), now held in New York City Hall. New York City Hall also hangs Trumbull's portrait of Mayor Richard Varick, who commissioned the 1790 portrait of Washington. New York also bought his full-length paintings of Alexander Hamilton (1805, the source of the face on the $10 bill) and John Jay. Trumbull was elected a Fellow of the American Academy of Arts and Sciences in 1791 and elected as a member of the American Philosophical Society in 1792.

He painted portraits of John Adams (1797), Jonathan Trumbull, and Rufus King (1800); Timothy Dwight and Stephen Van Rensselaer (both at Yale), Alexander Hamilton (one in the Metropolitan Museum of Art and one in the Boston Museum of Fine Arts, both taken from Ceracchi's bust), a self-portrait (1833), a full-length of Washington, held at Charleston, South Carolina; a full-length of Washington in uniform, General George Washington at Trenton, (1792, at Yale); and portraits of President and Mrs. Washington (1794), in the National Museum of American History.

Trumbull himself was painted by Gilbert Stuart and many others.

In 1794, Trumbull acted as secretary to John Jay in London during the negotiation of the treaty with Great Britain, which largely settled the boundary with Canada and began cotton export to the country. In 1796, he was appointed by the commissioners sent by the two countries as the fifth member of a commission charged with carrying out the seventh article of the Jay Treaty, which mediated claims by American and British merchants and the opposing government stemming from actions that occurred during the war. Shortly after the end of Trumbull's service on this commission, he traveled to Stuttgart to pick up the completed engraving of the Battle of Bunker's Hill. On the return trip, he passed through Paris and carried the first dispatch from the XYZ Affair out of France.

Trumbull later encountered hard times during which he was failing to sell his paintings individually. In 1831, he sold a series of 28 paintings and 60 miniature portraits to Yale University for an annuity of $1,000. After many years of trying to create income from his paintings, he had finally found a way to sustain himself from his art. This is by far the largest single collection of his works. The collection was originally housed in a neoclassical art gallery designed by Trumbull on Yale's Old Campus, along with portraits by other artists.

Later years

Trumbull was appointed president of the American Academy of the Fine Arts in New York City, serving from 1816 to 1836. Emphasizing classical traditions, Trumbull did not get along with the students. At the same time, his painting skills declined. In 1825, many of the students withdrew, founding the National Academy of Design. Unable to accommodate to changing tastes, the American Academy later closed in 1839 after a second fire destroyed its collections.

Trumbull wrote his autobiography, which he published in 1841. He died in New York City at the age of 87 on November 10, 1843.

Legacy and honors

Trumbull was originally interred (along with his wife) beneath the Art Gallery at Yale University, which he had designed. In 1867, the collection of his works was moved to the newly built Street Hall. His wife and his remains were reinterred on those grounds. The Trumbull Gallery was later razed.
1965, the John Trumbull Birthplace in Lebanon, Connecticut, was declared a National Historic Landmark.
1968, a John Trumbull commemorative postage stamp was printed.

In popular culture
Actor Buzz Bovshow played John Trumbull in the television miniseries John Adams.

Paintings
 The Death of General Warren at the Battle of Bunker's Hill, June 17, 1775
 The Death of General Montgomery in the Attack on Quebec, December 31, 1775
 Declaration of Independence
 The Capture of the Hessians at Trenton, December 26, 1776
 The Death of General Mercer at the Battle of Princeton, January 3, 1777
 The Surrender of General Burgoyne at Saratoga
 The Surrender of Cornwallis at Yorktown
 General George Washington Resigning His Commission
 Portraits of George Washington, John Adams and Alexander Hamilton
 The Death of Aemilius Paullus at the Battle of Cannae
 The Sortie Made by the Garrison of Gibraltar
 Self-portrait
 Portrait of Josiah Bartlett
 Jonathan Trumbull, Jr. (1740–1809) with Mrs. Trumbull (Eunice Backus) (1749–1826) and Faith Trumbull (1769–1846)

Gallery

Historic events

Portraits

Miniature portraits/sketches

References

Further reading

External links

 John Trumbull papers (MS 506). Manuscripts and Archives, Yale University Library. 
The Winterthur Library Overview of an archival collection on John Trumbull.
Union List of Artist Names, Getty Vocabularies. ULAN Full Record Display for John Trumbull. Getty Vocabulary Program, Getty Research Institute. Los Angeles, California.
Art and the Empire City: New York, 1825–1861, an exhibition catalog from The Metropolitan Museum of Art that contains material on Trumbull
Guide to the John Trumbull Papers, 1775–1842; New-York Historical Society
 

18th-century American painters
18th-century American male artists
American male painters
19th-century American painters
19th-century male artists
Continental Army officers from Connecticut
People of colonial Connecticut
American people of English descent
Harvard College alumni
People of Connecticut in the American Revolution
1756 births
1843 deaths
American romantic painters
American neoclassical painters
American portrait painters
Fellows of the American Academy of Arts and Sciences
Military personnel from Connecticut
People from Lebanon, Connecticut
American history painters
Aides-de-camp of George Washington
American Revolutionary War prisoners of war held by Great Britain